Sautela Bhai is a 1996 Indian Hindi-language film directed by B. R. Ishara, starring Rajesh Khanna, Raj Babbar, Kumar Gaurav in lead roles. The film was a delayed release in 1996 and a big flop. It is a remake of an old popular movie Dharti Kahe Pukar Ke.

Cast
 Rajesh Khanna as Master Tulsiram 
 Raj Babbar as Advocate Rajaram 
 Kumar Gaurav as Shankar
 Farah as Bindiya 
 Moon Moon Sen as Sheena
 Deepti Naval as Saraswati 
 Ranjeet as Rehman
 Amjad Khan as Thakur Narayandas
 Raja Bundela as Gopal
 A. K. Hangal as Bindiya's Maternal Grandfather
 Satyendra Kapoor as Advocate Surendranath

Soundtrack
All tracks were penned by Majrooh Sultanpuri.

References

External links 
 
 Cult of Kumar

1996 films
1990s Hindi-language films
Indian family films
Indian romantic drama films
Films scored by R. D. Burman
1996 romantic drama films
Films directed by B. R. Ishara